Edward Crosby "Ned" Johnson III (June 29, 1930 – March 23, 2022) was an American billionaire businessman who, along with daughter Abigail Johnson, owned and ran Fidelity Investments and Fidelity International until his death in March 2022. In April 2021, his net worth was estimated at US$8.2 billion.

Early life 
Johnson was the son of Elsie Livingston Johnson and Edward C. Johnson II. He attended prep school at Milton Academy before transferring to Tabor Academy, and graduated with a bachelor's degree from Harvard College in 1954.

Career
After a stint in the US Army, he became a research analyst at Fidelity Investments in 1957, a company founded by his father in 1949. He later became the portfolio manager for the Fidelity Trend Fund in 1960 and ran the famous Fidelity Magellan Fund from 1963 to 1977. He then became president of the company in 1972, and chairman and CEO in 1977.

Johnson was the first to begin the practice of permitting check writing on money market funds. He was also the first to sell discount brokerage services to banks, insurance companies, and consumers. He supported and invested in automation of brokerage sales and operations.

In a November 2016, memo to Fidelity employees, Johnson announced he would retire in December and turn over the chairmanship to his daughter Abigail. Although he will no longer be a member of the board of directors, Johnson planned to "maintain office hours ... and continue to consult periodically with Abby."

Society memberships, awards, and honors 
Johnson was a fellow of the American Academy of Arts and Sciences, a trustee of the Beth Israel Hospital and the Boston Museum of Fine Arts and a member of the Boston Society of Security Analysts.

He has been given honorary doctorates by Boston University, Bentley College and the Hobart and William Smith Colleges. He was an honorary fellow of London Business School.

Wealth and philanthropy

Ned Johnson III was a descendent of loyalist merchant and slaveholder Robert Gilbert Livingston (1712-1789) and Catharina Johnson McPheadres Livingston. Livingston had over a hundred thousand acres in New York on the Hudson River Valley, Brooklyn, Long Island and Harlem. By royal charter of George I of Great Britain in 1686, Robert "The Elder" Livingston (1654-1728) was granted a patent to 160,000 acres along the Hudson River. 

With an estimated  net worth of around $8.4 billion, he was ranked by Forbes as the 57th richest person in America.

In 1965, the USbased Fidelity Foundation was founded by Edward C. Johnson III and his father. The Edward C. Johnson Fund, a $334 million charitable fund, contributes to institutions in the Boston area and beyond.

Personal life
His wife was Elizabeth B. "Lillie" Johnson, a trustee of the Museum of Fine Arts and Winterthur Museum. They resided in Boston.

His daughter Abigail took over the role of CEO of Fidelity Investments and chairman of Fidelity International in 2014. , Abigail owned up to 24% of the shares in Fidelity, had a net worth of $10.3 billion and was ranked 29th on the Forbes 400 list of richest Americans.

His other daughter is Elizabeth L. Johnson. In 2012, it was estimated that Elizabeth had a net worth of roughly $2.5 billion.

His son, Edward Johnson IV, is president of family-owned Pembroke Real Estate. The firm manages 6.5 million square feet of office and residential real estate, including the Boston Seaport. In 2012, Edward's net worth was estimated at $2.5 billion.

Johnson was born in Milton, Massachusetts. He served in the United States Army. On March 23, 2022, Johnson died "peacefully at his home in Florida surrounded by much of his family," according to his daughter Abby Johnson.

References

External links 
 Babson College Profile
 IRS Form 990, Edward C. Johnson Fund, 82 Devonshire Street S3, Boston, MA, 020109, Anne Marie Soulli, Director.
  https://www.findagrave.com/memorial/238053399/edward-crosby-johnson

1930 births
2022 deaths
People from Milton, Massachusetts
Businesspeople from Massachusetts
Military personnel from Massachusetts
American money managers
American financial analysts
Harvard College alumni
Stock and commodity market managers
American philanthropists
American billionaires
United States Army soldiers
American chief executives of financial services companies
Milton Academy alumni
Fidelity International
20th-century American businesspeople
Tabor Academy (Massachusetts) alumni